Wang Jiao, known by his tag Banana, is a Chinese Dota 2 player who is currently the coach for Newbee. He was part of the Newbee team that won what was then the single largest money prize in video game history, a 5,028,308 payout at The International 4 (TI4) at the KeyArena, in Seattle, Washington. Newbee defeated ViCi Gaming three game to one. e-Sports Earnings estimates that Banana has won a total of 1,192,049.89 individually from tournaments. As of April 14, 2015, after TI4 Wang "Banana" Jiao was the highest ranking player in terms of prize money won across all competitive video games. Banana joined Newbee in March 2014.

Tournament placings

Defense of the Ancients

Dota 2

References

External links
 Banana on Weibo
 Banana on 163.com 

Dota players
Living people
Chinese esports players
NewBee players
LGD Gaming players
Year of birth missing (living people)
Dota coaches